"Glasshouse" is a 1975 R&B single by The Temptations. It was written by Motown songwriting team Charlemagne, which consisted of James Carmichael, Ronald Miller and Kathy Wakefield. The song appeared on the album A Song for You. It was the last top forty hit for The Temptations, going to number thirty-seven pop and number nine on the R&B charts. "Glasshouse" also peaked in the top ten on the US Disco chart.

Background
All five Temptations alternate lead vocals, singing about how people who live in glasshouses "shouldn't throw no stones".

Chart performance

References

1975 singles
The Temptations songs
Songs written by Ron Miller (songwriter)
Songs written by Kathy Wakefield
1975 songs